"Amy's Baking Company" is the 16th episode of the sixth season of Kitchen Nightmares, and the 82nd episode of the series. The episode first aired on May 10, 2013, and centered on Gordon Ramsay attempting to help Amy and Samy Bouzaglo, owners of Amy's Baking Company in Scottsdale, Arizona.

The episode marked the only time in the history of both the UK and the US versions of Kitchen Nightmares that Ramsay was unable to complete the restaurant's transformation due to conflict with the owners. The owners' violent behaviors received negative attention on social media, and the manner in which they responded to this critical reception further fueled the controversy, prompting Forbes to refer to this as an example of how a business should not react to comments posted on social media.

A follow-up episode, "Return to Amy's Baking Company", aired as the season-seven premiere on April 11, 2014.

Synopsis
Amy and Samy Bouzaglo, the husband-and-wife owners, explain the history of their restaurant: Samy invested over a million dollars to build the restaurant in 2006  to fulfill Amy's dreams. About two years prior to the episode's filming, bloggers began writing negative reviews of the restaurant's food and pointing out the owners' behavior. Amy says the reviews are "lies" and states that they cost the restaurant a "tremendous amount of business".

The day before Ramsay arrives, the camera crew witnesses an intense argument between Samy and a customer. It starts when the customer complains to Samy that  his friend and he had been waiting for a pizza for over an hour, causing Samy to lash out at him and order the two customers to leave, but not before insisting that the two customers pay for the drinks they have received. Samy then turns his attention to the customer's friend, while Amy threatens to call the police. Just when it appears that Samy and the customer will come to blows, a cameraman steps in and escorts the customers out of the restaurant. Amy then berates and insults the other customers in the restaurant before storming back into the kitchen.

Upon his arrival, Ramsay is initially impressed with the kitchen's good hygiene and organization, and is impressed by Amy's desserts, though becomes more wary when Amy admits that she closes the restaurant if either of the owners are not there. After the initial discussion, Ramsay prepares to sample the dishes. He has a rather negative response towards the menu items; the fig and pear prosciutto pizza was very sweet and made with undercooked dough; the blue-ribbon burger was not medium rare as requested, with a combination of condiments that Ramsay finds bizarre, and a bun dripping with grease; the red pepper ravioli exhibits a combination of sweet and spicy flavors that Ramsay calls "confusing", and he learns from Samy that it was mass-produced frozen ravioli despite the menu advertising it as "freshly made"; and the salmon burger is overcooked with an unappealing presentation. Samy reveals to Ramsay that he does not tell Amy about the problems with the dishes, as he knows she does not deal well with criticism. At another point during the sampling, Ramsay learns from one of the servers, Miranda Winant, that neither the other servers nor she make any tips, but that they instead go to Samy. Ramsay discusses this with Samy, who justifies the policy by saying he does much of the front-of-house work, though Miranda reveals that Samy does not always properly put the orders in and often omits dishes that were ordered as a result of this. Samy was also operating a PoS machine poorly. Miranda said she could operate the machine, but Samy refused and told her to go away.

Later, during dinner service, Ramsay criticizes Amy and Samy for the food he was served during lunch, and Amy responds by denying any wrongdoing because Samy refused to tell her the problems about the food. Ramsay also criticizes Amy for using frozen ravioli instead of making it fresh, and announces to the customers that the ravioli is off the menu, which does not sit well with Amy. Throughout the night, customers are seen complaining about the long waiting, and several customers are shown sending back dishes they disliked. At one point, Amy accidentally gives the wrong table number to Miranda. Subsequently, when giving food to Katy Cipriano, another server, as well as the table number, Katy asks, "Are you sure?" Amy responds by accusing her of having an "attitude problem" and demands that she leave. When Ramsay witnesses a customer giving a tip intended for the servers and Samy taking it for himself, Samy again defends the policy, stating that the waiting staff receive an hourly wage. This prompts Ramsay to inform the customer that all tips go to the restaurant's management and not the servers, to which the customer replies, "That's horrible." Samy and Ramsay then get into a heated, profanity-laced argument, in which Ramsay tells Samy he is not allowed to take his servers' tips. Amy closes the restaurant, and fires Katy on the spot. Samy attempts to dissuade Amy, but she does not relent, later describing Katy, who leaves the premises in tears, as a "poisonous little viper".

Ramsay returns to the restaurant the next day, only to find it closed, because neither of the owners were at the premises. Ramsay takes this opportunity to talk to Henry and Jessica, who previously worked in the restaurant. Both describe horrible working experiences; Henry claims Samy made him wash his car and Jessica claims that at least 50 people were fired during the 18-month period when she worked at the restaurant. He also started to talk to Pam, another worker, who admitted to Ramsay that on one occasion, Samy had hit her. Ramsay then attempts to talk to Amy and Samy, telling them what they are doing wrong. Amy refuses to listen and becomes increasingly aggressive and hostile towards Ramsay. Samy even reveals that they had actually fired 100 employees, not 50. As a result, Ramsay realizes they are not open to making any changes and leaves the restaurant, and in a concluding monologue, states that this is the first time he has met restaurant owners that he could not help. Before leaving the area, he cites the fact that the restaurant has gone through a hundred staff members, stating that Amy and Samy have infuriated the local community and are incapable of accepting criticism, and believes that they would not have adhered to any changes he would have implemented to improve the restaurant, regardless.

Production
The episode was shot in December 2012. On December 10, a local media interview with a diner described his altercation with Samy during taping. The diner saw what he thought was an act for the purposes of the show, but a producer told him, "what was happening was real". The diner went on to explain that police were on the scene by the time he left the restaurant. The diner reported that the police were responding to a "911 hang-up call" from the restaurant, and that they left after "concluding everything was fine".

Reception and reaction

The episode premiered on May 10, 2013, and was viewed by about 3.34 million people. It was seen by 1.2% of all 18- to 49-year-olds and 5% of all 18- to 49-year-olds watching television at the time of the broadcast. The episode met with praise from reviewers, with one critic writing, "The episode is nothing short of amazing."

After the show aired, the restaurant, which was located in a shopping center at Scottsdale Road and Shea Boulevard, became a momentary tourist attraction. The restaurant received extensive negative feedback on their official Facebook page. When owners Amy and Samy responded by denouncing people who posted negative comments, they provoked more of the same, not only on Facebook, but also on Yelp and Reddit. Forbes used the reactions as a poster example of how a business should not react to comments on social media. The owners later stated that they were hacked, and that they had not posted any of the comments. The couple later claimed that the unsatisfied customers seen in the episode were in fact actors. This prompted more negative responses and the original comments and responses were eventually removed. As a result of the Kitchen Nightmares episode and Facebook posts, awareness of the incident caused the "meltdown" to go viral.

The company hired a local public relations firm, and a second Facebook page was eventually taken down, as well, while another one called "I support Amy's Baking Company Bakery Boutique & Bistro 100 percent" appeared on May 15. A press release announced that they would be holding a "Grand Reopening" on May 21, 2013. On April 11, 2014, Kitchen Nightmares aired a special episode revolving around the events at Amy's Baking Company during and after the episode aired with a new, specially recorded interview with the owners conducted by local reporter Ana Garcia.

Amy's Baking Company permanently closed on September 1, 2015. Amy Bouzaglo explained that the development stemmed from problems with the building's former landlord, and not the TV series. She also indicated her future career plans included making desserts for a Phoenix-area restaurant group and producing online instructional cooking videos. The building that hosted Amy's Baking Company hosted another restaurant called "B&R Restaurant" for a while before also closing, and is now host to an Aikido school.

References

2013 in Arizona
2013 American television episodes
Buildings and structures in Scottsdale, Arizona
Restaurants in Phoenix